Mau Wu Tsai is a village in the Tseung Kwan O area of Sai Kung District, New Territories, Hong Kong.

Administration
Mau Wu Tsai is a recognized village under the New Territories Small House Policy.

References

External links

 Delineation of area of existing village Mau Wu Tsai (Hang Hau) for election of resident representative (2019 to 2022)

 

Villages in Sai Kung District, Hong Kong
Tseung Kwan O